Ann Haven Morgan (born "Anna" May 6, 1882 – June 5, 1966) was an American zoologist and ecologist.

Biography
One of three children of Stanley G. Morgan and Julia A. Douglass Morgan, Anna Morgan was born in Waterford, Connecticut and attended Williams Memorial Institute in New London, Connecticut. In 1902, Anna joined Wellesley College then transferred to Cornell University. After receiving a B.A in 1906, she worked as an assistant and instructor for the Mount Holyoke College department of zoology until 1909. At Cornell University, she was awarded a Ph.D. in 1912 with a dissertation titled, A Contribution to the Biology of the May-fly, after which she became a professor at Mount Holyoke College. Morgan became an associate professor in 1914, then a full professor in 1918. From 1916–1947 she was the chair of the Mount Holyoke zoology department, serving until she retired. During this period, in the summer months she also taught marine zoology at the Woods Hole Marine Biological Laboratory. She died of stomach cancer in South Hadley, Massachusetts.

Her research and instruction focused on limnology, animal hibernation, and ecological and environmental issues. She authored three books on zoology. The 1933 edition of American Men of Science listed her along with two other women among the 250 total entries. She was awarded research fellowships from the American Association for the Advancement of Science, the Rockefeller Foundation and the National Academy of Sciences.

Bibliography
 Kinships of Animals and Man (1955)
 Field Book of Animals in Winter (1939) 
 Field Book of Ponds and Streams: an Introduction to the Life of Fresh Water (1930)

References

External links
Ann Haven Morgan papers at Mount Holyoke College
 EarlyWomenInScience.com: Biodiversity exhibition, Ann Haven Morgan section

1882 births
1966 deaths
American ecologists
American non-fiction environmental writers
Women ecologists
American entomologists
Women entomologists
American ichthyologists
Women ichthyologists
American taxonomists
Women taxonomists
American limnologists
Mount Holyoke College faculty
Cornell University alumni
People from South Hadley, Massachusetts
Scientists from Massachusetts
20th-century American non-fiction writers
20th-century American zoologists
20th-century American women scientists
20th-century American women writers
American nature writers
Women limnologists
American women academics